is the fifth vessel of the s of the Japan Maritime Self-Defense Force (JMSDF).

Design
However, when weapo layout was changed, the internal structure was also been changed. The large lattice mast was thought to have a negative on the stealthiness of the Murasame class, so in Takanami class, a planned change to two smaller masts was conceived, but was not implemented.

Although its displacement become slightly increased, there is no change in its main engines, as it is not a big difference that has little effect on the performance of the ship.

Construction and career 
Suzunami was authorized under the Medium-term defense buildup plan of 1996, and was built by IHI Marine United shipyards in Yokohama. She was laid down on 24 September 2003 and launched on 26 August 2004. The destroyer was commissioned into service on 16 February 2006, and was initially assigned to the JMSDF Escort Flotilla 3 based at Maizuru, Kyoto.

Suzunami, along with the fleet oiler Hamana were assigned to the Indian Ocean in March 2007 to provide assistance in refueling anti-terrorist coalition forces in Afghanistan as part of Operation Enduring Freedom. She returned to Japan in July 2007. On 25 March 2008, she was reassigned to the JMSDF Escort Flotilla 1, based at Yokosuka, Kanagawa.

On 21 July 2009, Suzunami, along with the fleet oiler Oumi, was again dispatched for coalition refueling operations in the Indian Ocean. She returned to Japan on the completion of this mission on 24 December 2009. On 8 April 2010, while monitoring a fleet of five People's Liberation Army Navy warships in international waters in the East China Sea, Suzunami was buzzed at abnormally low altitude by a Chinese helicopter. This incident led the Japanese government to file a protest against the Chinese government on 12 April. On 1 August 2011, she was reassigned to the JMSDF Escort Flotilla 3, based at Ōminato, Aomori Prefecture.

On 13 August 2012 Suzunami was dispatched to Aden, Yemen, as part of ongoing anti-piracy escort operations off the coast of Somalia. The context for this extended deployment off the Horn of Africa was the "Law on the Penalization of Acts of Piracy and Measures Against Acts of Piracy (Anti-Piracy Measures Law)". During these deployments, she made a port call at Port Klang, Malaysia from 29–30 December.

Suzunami returned to Yokosuka on 10 June 2013 and remains assigned to the Third Squadron of the JMSDF Escort Flotilla 3.

Notes

References

 
Saunders, Stephen. IHS Jane's Fighting Ships 2013-2014. Jane's Information Group (2003). 

2004 ships
Takanami-class destroyers
Ships built by IHI Corporation